The Vickers F.B.12 was a biplane pusher fighter aircraft developed during World War I by Vickers Limited. The failure of the engine for which it was designed, and the obsolescence of the pusher configuration, resulted in its remaining an experimental type only.

Development and design
At the start of the First World War, Vickers entered into a partnership with the Hart Engine Company to develop a 150 hp (110 kW) nine-cylinder radial engine designed by Hart. This engine was planned to power a number of new designs by Vickers, the first of which was a small single-engine pusher biplane fighter, the F.B.12.

The F.B.12 shared the obsolescent pusher layout of the D.H.2 and F.E.8, although the raised nacelle vastly improved the rear view from the cockpit.  The wings were of wood and fabric construction, with rounded tips. The circular nacelle was framed in steel tubing, with the engine directly behind the cockpit, driving a wooden propeller. The tail was at the end of a structure of steel booms. A .303 in (7.7 mm) machine gun was placed inside the front of the nacelle, with only the barrel protruding.

The first FB.12 flew in June 1916, powered by an 80 hp (60 kW) Le Rhône rotary engine as the Hart was not yet available. With this engine, it proved to be underpowered and was re-fitted with a 100 hp (75 kW) Gnome Monosoupape engine.  It was then rebuilt with increased wing span and area, becoming the F.B.12A. In December 1916 it was sent to France for operational testing, where it was deemed as good as the D.H.2 and F.E.8, a rather back-handed recommendation as both these types were by now well outclassed by the latest German fighters, the Albatros D.Is.

The F.B.12B was similar to the F.B.12A, but fitted with the originally intended Hart engine, flying early in 1917. In November 1916, meanwhile, the War Office placed an order for 50 Hart-powered aircraft, designated the F.B.12C  for the RFC. The F.B.12B crashed during tests in early 1917, leading to Vickers abandoning the Hart. Only 18 of the order were built, being fitted with a number of different engines including a 110 hp (80 kW) Le Rhône and a 100 hp (75 kW) Anzani radial. Tested between May and July 1917, only one F.B.12C was delivered, to a Home Defence unit.

The F.B.12D was the final variation, only one prototype was produced with a larger 110 hp (80 kW) Le Rhone engine.

Operators

Royal Flying Corps

Variants
 F.B.12
 F.B.12a  Mono-Gnome engine
 F.B.12b  150 hp (110 kW) Hart radial engine
 F.B.12c  flat-sided nacelle, larger fin and rudder. 18 production aircraft built.
 F.B.12d  110 hp (80 kW) Le Rhone or 100 hp (75 kW) Gnome Monosoupape engine

Specifications (F.B.12)

See also

References

Bibliography
 .
 .

1910s British fighter aircraft
Single-engined pusher aircraft
F.B.12
Military aircraft of World War I
Aircraft first flown in 1916